Nellie Morse (1921–1941) was an American Thoroughbred racehorse best known as the fourth filly to win the Preakness Stakes. After her retirement from racing, she became a successful and influential broodmare.

Background
Her sire was Luke McLuke, who won the 1914 Belmont Stakes and was a son of the important but unraced Ultimus, who was sired by Commando. From the mare La Venganza, Nellie Morse's damsire was the Australian multi-race winner Abercorn.

Owned by the prominent American cartoonist Bud Fisher, Nellie Morse was trained by Albert B. Gordon.

Racing career
Sent to the track at age two, the filly won the five-furlong Fashion Stakes at Belmont Park and was second in the Spinaway Stakes. In the Matron Stakes, she finished ahead of future U.S. Racing Hall of Fame inductee Princess Doreen but was second to Greentree Stables' winning filly Tree Top.

In 1924, she won the 1⅛ mile Pimlico Oaks at Pimlico Race Course in Baltimore, Maryland. Racing against colts, on May 12, 1924, Nellie Morse won the second of what became the American Classic Races: the Preakness Stakes. She was the fourth filly to win the Preakness since its inception fifty-one years earlier in 1873, and was the last filly winner until Rachel Alexandra won the 2009.  Nellie Morse then finished third - placed second via disqualification of the apparent winner Glide - to Princess Doreen in the Kentucky Oaks at Churchill Downs.

Breeding record
Retired from racing to serve as a broodmare, Nellie Morse was notably mated to Reigh Count, producing Count Morse, winner of the 1937 Ben Ali Stakes and Clark Handicap. Her mating to American Flag produced the filly Nellie Flag, who was the 1934 American Champion Two-Year-Old Filly. Through Nellie Flag, her later descendants include Mark-Ye-Well, Bold Forbes and Bet Twice.

Nellie Morse died in 1941 at age twenty.

Breeding

References

1921 racehorse births
1941 racehorse deaths
Racehorses bred in Kentucky
Racehorses trained in the United States
Preakness Stakes winners
Thoroughbred family 9-f